Sacar may refer to:

 Sacar (charity), a charity in the United Kingdom
 Sacara nigripalpis, a synonym for the moth genus Aventiola
 Sacar or Sachar, a biblical name
 Sacar, editor of About Woman, a compilation of writings by Sri Nolini Kanta Gupta

See also
 Sacario, American rapper and songwriter